Miss Venezuela 2008 was the 55th Miss Venezuela pageant, was held in Caracas, Venezuela, on September 10, 2008, after weeks of events.  The winner of the pageant was Stefanía Fernández, Miss Trujillo.

The pageant was broadcast live on Venevisión from the Poliedro de Caracas in Caracas, Venezuela. At the conclusion of the final night of competition, outgoing titleholder Dayana Mendoza (Miss Venezuela 2007 and Miss Universe 2008) crowned Stefania Fernández of Trujillo as the new Miss Venezuela.

The contest, whose winner will attempt to become the first woman to win a Miss Universe title for her country in consecutive years, was marked by the elimination of the titles of Costa Oriental and Peninsula Goajira (now represented solely by Zulia state) and the consequent reduction to 28 delegates.  On July 29, Osmel Sousa assumed further control of the selection process by directly appointing the 28 final contestants from a pool of 73 candidates.  Although winners of regional and state contests have never been guaranteed participation in the final Miss Venezuela pageant, this direct selection resulted in the unprecedented elimination of the representatives of Falcón, Lara, Sucre, Vargas and Nueva Esparta.  In addition to the two aforementioned titleholders from Zulia, a total of seven state winners were consequently stripped of their titles, which will be carried in the final pageant by other candidates.

Schedule of events
August 13: "Best Smile" and "Miss Beauty" event in the Quinta La Esmeralda, in Caracas. Miss Táchira, Jennipher Bortolas and Miss Sucre, Natasha Domínguez, won the titles respectively.
August 19: "Best Face" award competition in the Radisson Plaza Eurobuilding Hotel, in Caracas. Stefanía Fernández, Miss Trujillo, won the title.
August 30: The Beauty Gala (Gala de la Belleza), live on Venevisión.
September 2: The 28 delegates visit the Ebel Corporation, in Guatire.
September 10: The finals was held in the Poliedro de Caracas.
September 11: The official Breakfast with Miss Venezuela 2008 and Miss World Venezuela 2008 in the Radisson Plaza Eurobuilding Hotel, in Caracas.

Results

Special awards
 Miss Photogenic (voted by press reporters) – Natasha Domínguez (Sucre)
 Miss Internet (voted by www.missvenezuela.com viewers) – Dayana Borges (Dependencias Federales)
 Miss Congeniality (voted by Miss Venezuela contestants) – Adahisa Peña (Apure)
 Best Evening Gown – Laksmi Rodríguez (Monagas)
 Miss Elegance – Stefanía Fernández (Trujillo)
 Best Body – Stefanía Fernández (Trujillo)
 Miss Personality – Verónica Arcay (Portuguesa)
 Best Catwalk – Kenya Barreto (Bolívar)
 Miss Integral – Natasha Domínguez (Sucre)
 Miss Silhouette – Marielis Ontiveros (Vargas)
 Best Smile – Jennipher Bortolas (Táchira)
 Miss Beauty – Natasha Domínguez (Sucre)
 Best Face – Stefanía Fernández (Trujillo)

Official delegates

Notes
Stefanía Fernández won the 2009 Miss Universe pageant in Nassau, Bahamas, marking the first time that a country won two times in a row.
Laksmi Rodríguez placed as Semifinalist in Miss International 2009 in Chengdu, China. She also competed in Miss Supranational 2010 in Plock, Poland, when she placed as Semifinalist.
Gabriela Concepción placed as 1st runner-up in Top Model of The World 2010 in Dortmund, Germany. and semifinalist the Miss Continente Americano 2010
Ligia Hernández placed as 4th runner-up in Reina Hispanoamericana 2008 in Santa Cruz, Bolivia.
Natasha Domínguez placed as 2nd runner-up in Reinado Internacional del Café 2009 in Manizales, Colombia.
Viviana Ramos previously won Miss Globe International 2006 in Saranda, Albania.

References

External links
 Miss Venezuela official website
 Miss Venezuela La Nueva Era MB

2008 in Venezuela
2008 beauty pageants